Gymnascella is a genus of fungi in the family Gymnoascaceae. It was described by American mycologist Charles Horton Peck in 1884 with Gymnascella aurantiaca as the type species.

Species
Gymnascella aurantiaca
Gymnascella calcarea
Gymnascella citrina
Gymnascella confluens
Gymnascella dankaliensis
Gymnascella devroeyi
Gymnascella hyalinospora
Gymnascella kamyschkoi
Gymnascella marismortui
Gymnascella nodulosa

References

External links

Eurotiomycetes genera
Onygenales
Taxa named by Charles Horton Peck
Taxa described in 1884